Sergei Petrovich Olshansky (born May 28, 1948 in Moscow) is a retired Soviet football player.

Currently, he works as a general director for FC Nika Moscow.

Honours
 Soviet Top League winner: 1969
 Soviet Cup winner: 1971
 Olympic bronze: 1972

International career
Olshansky made his debut for USSR on August 6, 1972 in a friendly against Sweden. He played in the qualifiers for 1974 FIFA World Cup, UEFA Euro 1976 and 1978 FIFA World Cup (USSR did not qualify for the final tournaments for any of those).

References
  Profile

1948 births
Living people
Soviet footballers
Soviet Union international footballers
Russian footballers
Soviet Top League players
FC Spartak Moscow players
PFC CSKA Moscow players
Olympic footballers of the Soviet Union
Footballers at the 1972 Summer Olympics
Olympic bronze medalists for the Soviet Union
Soviet football managers
Russian football managers
Olympic medalists in football
FC SKA-Khabarovsk players

Medalists at the 1972 Summer Olympics
Association football defenders